K2-3b also known as EPIC 201367065 b is an exoplanet orbiting the red dwarf K2-3 every 10 days. It is the largest and most massive planet of the K2-3 system, with about 2.3 times the radius of Earth and almost 7 times the mass. Its density of about 3.0 g/cm3 indicates a composition of almost entirely water, or a hydrogen envelope comprising 0.7% of the planet's mass.

References

Exoplanets discovered in 2015
Transiting exoplanets
K2-3 system
3

Leo (constellation)